Ctenisodes is a genus of ant-loving beetles in the family Staphylinidae. There are about 14 described species in Ctenisodes.

Species
These 14 species belong to the genus Ctenisodes:

 Ctenisodes abruptus (Casey, 1894)
 Ctenisodes cinderella (Casey, 1897)
 Ctenisodes consobrinus (LeConte, 1849)
 Ctenisodes floridanus (Casey, 1897)
 Ctenisodes georgianus (Casey, 1897)
 Ctenisodes granicollis (Casey, 1897)
 Ctenisodes impressipennis (Casey, 1897)
 Ctenisodes iowensis (Casey, 1897)
 Ctenisodes lacustris (Casey, 1897)
 Ctenisodes ocularis (Casey, 1894)
 Ctenisodes piceus (LeConte, 1849)
 Ctenisodes pulvereus (LeConte, 1851)
 Ctenisodes saginatus (Casey, 1897)
 Ctenisodes zimmermanni (LeConte, 1849)

References

Further reading

 
 
 

Pselaphitae
Articles created by Qbugbot